Bamforth–Lazarus syndrome is a genetic condition that results in thyroid dysgenesis.  It is due to recessive mutations in forkhead/winged-helix domain transcription factor (FKLH15 or TTF2). It is associated with FOXE1.

References

External links 

Genetic diseases and disorders
Syndromes affecting the endocrine system